Paterius (died 606) was a bishop of Brescia. He is known as a compiler, in particular of works of Pope Gregory I, for whom he had worked as a notary.

His sole surviving work is the Liber testimoniorum veteris testamenti, an anthology of Gregory's works of biblical exegesis, arranged in the order of the biblical passages discussed. The work survives in over 120 complete or partial manuscripts.

Notes

References
 
 
 
 
 
 

6th-century births
606 deaths
Bishops of Brescia
6th-century historians
7th-century Italian bishops
6th-century Latin writers
6th-century Italian writers